Wognonwon Georcelin Péhé (born 10 August 1980 in Abidjan) is an Ivorian football player who currently plays for Stade d'Abidjan.

Career
He began his career by Académie de Sol Beni and joined 2000 to ASEC Mimosas, the club from Abidjan transferred him one year later in July 2001 to Satellite club K.S.K. Beveren. He played 3 years for Beveren, joined then in 2004 to R.O.C. de Charleroi-Marchienne and played there between of the end of his contract on 30 June 2008. His contract was terminated and he left the club and signed for Stade d'Abidjan.

References

1980 births
Living people
Ivorian footballers
ASEC Mimosas players
K.S.K. Beveren players
Ivorian expatriates in Belgium
R. Olympic Charleroi Châtelet Farciennes players
Association football midfielders
Expatriate footballers in Belgium
Footballers from Abidjan